This list of Malta-flagged cargo ships consists of vessels which are registered in Malta and subject to the laws of that country. Malta is a prolific flag state, largely due to its status as a flag of convenience. A total of 1,196 bulk carriers, container ships, and general cargo ships flew the Maltese flag in 2021. Any ship which flew the flag at any point in its career, and is present in the encyclopedia, is listed here.

List of ships

References 

Malta
~